Tollefson is the Americanized spelling of the Norwegian "Tollefsen".

Tollefson is a surname shared by the following people:

Carrie Tollefson, an American middle-distance runner
Chuck Tollefson, a former American football player for the Green Bay Packers
Dave Tollefson, an American football player for the New York Giants
Thor C. Tollefson, a US Representative from Washington
Sean Tollefson, a singer/songwriter for the indie band Tullycraft

References

Ronald Tollefson is an American that served an LDS mission to Norway in the 1960s.